Krykyloceras is a genus of early nautilids that lived during the Middle Devonian, a member of the same order that includes the recent Nautilus.

References

 Krykyloceras, Paleodb/fossilworks. 
 Jack Sepkoski's list of Cephalopod genera, 

Prehistoric nautiloid genera